Pete Romcevich (July 7, 1906–September 7, 1952) was a Serbian-American racecar driver. He was born Slavko Romčević to a Serbian family in the small village of Stipan near Lasinja, Croatia in what was then the Kingdom of Croatia-Slavonia (an autonomous kingdom within the Austro-Hungarian Empire). Romcevich arrived to the United States in 1922 as a 16-year old, joining his brother, Gjuro (George) Romčević who emigrated and arrived in the United States first. George saved money and sent for Pete.  Romcevich had a successful midget car racing career and fabricated racing cars at his Speedway Garage in Roby, Indiana (now part of Hammond, Indiana). He qualified and raced in the 1947 Indianapolis 500 driving a car owned by Anthony "Andy" Granatelli and attempted to qualify again in one of Granatelli's cars before a crash during qualifying.  He was killed in a midget race at the Michigan State Fairgrounds Speedway in Detroit when his car went out of control.

Indianapolis 500 results

References

1906 births
1952 deaths
American racing drivers
Serbian racing drivers
Racing drivers who died while racing
Indianapolis 500 drivers
Yugoslav emigrants to the United States
American people of Serbian descent
Sports deaths in Michigan